The Infamous John Friend is the title of both a 1909 novel and the 1959 BBC television miniseries based on it. The novel was written by Martha Roscoe Garnett (1869–1946). It is a work of historical fiction set in 1805 during the Napoleonic Wars. The title character, John Friend, is a spy in the employ of Napoleon. Originally published by G. Duckworth & Co. Ltd., London, it was reprinted in 1975 by Chivers, Bath.

Television adaptation
The 1959 miniseries starred William Lucas in the title role and much of the music used was that of Hector Berlioz with the opening bars of the 4th movement of Harold in Italy used at the start of each of the eight half-hour episodes.

Cast
 William Lucas as John Friend
 Barry Foster as William North 
 David Peel as Francois Sauvignac
 Margaret Tyzack as Mrs. Friend
 Pat Pleasence as Susan Marny 
 Margaret Dale as Betty 
 David Baron as Lord Combleigh 
 Bernard Kay as Jack Rangsley 
 Manning Wilson as William Pitt

References

 Literature on the Age of Napoleon
 getCITED
 
 Experience of Berlioz Music

1909 British novels
British historical novels
British television miniseries
Television shows based on British novels
British novels adapted into television shows
Fiction set in 1805